Carolus-Duran was a French painter and art instructor known for his stylish depictions of members of high society in Third Republic France.

Works

See also
Carolus-Duran

Notes and references
Notes

References

External links

Carolus-Duran Works Online

Carolus-Duran